Dīvāneh (also spelled Divana and Ḏiwāna) is a village in Farah Province, Afghanistan.

References

Populated places in Farah Province